Bethany Galat (born August 10, 1995) is an American swimmer specialising in breaststroke. She competed in the women's 200 metre breaststroke event at the 2017 World Aquatics Championships and won the silver medal.

References

External links
 
 

1995 births
Living people
People from Mishawaka, Indiana
American female swimmers
Swimmers from Indiana
World Aquatics Championships medalists in swimming
Pan American Games medalists in swimming
Pan American Games silver medalists for the United States
Swimmers at the 2019 Pan American Games
American female breaststroke swimmers
Medalists at the 2019 Pan American Games
Texas A&M Aggies women's swimmers
21st-century American women